The 2012–13 network television schedule for the five major English-language commercial broadcast networks in the United States covers primetime hours from September 2012 through August 2013. The schedule is followed by a list per network of returning series, new series, and series canceled after the 2011–12 season.

NBC was the first to announce its fall schedule on May 13, 2012, followed by Fox on May 14, then ABC on May 15, CBS on May 16, and The CW on May 17, 2012.

PBS is not included; member stations have local flexibility over most of their schedules and broadcast times for network shows may vary. The CW is not included on weekends, when it does not offer network programming. Ion Television airs primarily syndicated reruns, along with new episodes of The Listener from Canada's CTV and professional wrestling program WWE Main Event. MyNetworkTV also offers syndicated reruns, with no original programming.

New series are highlighted in bold.

All times are U.S. Eastern Time and Pacific Time (except for some live sports or events). Subtract one hour for Central and Mountain times.

Each of the 30 highest-rated shows is listed with its rank and rating as determined by Nielsen Media Research.

Legend

Sunday

Monday

Tuesday

Wednesday

Thursday

Friday

Note: Community and Whitney were originally scheduled, respectively, to air at 8:00 PM and 8:30 PM on NBC.

Saturday

By network

ABC

Returning series
20/20
ABC Saturday Movie of the Week
America's Funniest Home Videos
The Bachelor
The Bachelorette
Body of Proof
Castle
Dancing with the Stars
Don't Trust the B---- in Apartment 23
Extreme Weight Loss
Grey's Anatomy
Happy Endings
Last Man Standing
The Lookout
The Middle
Modern Family
Once Upon a Time
Primetime: What Would You Do?
Private Practice
Revenge
Rookie Blue
Saturday Night Football
Scandal
Secret Millionaire
Shark Tank
Suburgatory
Wife Swap
Wipeout

New series
666 Park Avenue
Bet on Your Baby *
Family Tools *
How to Live with Your Parents (For the Rest of Your Life) *
Last Resort
Malibu Country
Mistresses *
Motive *
Nashville
The Neighbors
Red Widow *
Splash *
The Taste *
Whodunnit? *
Zero Hour *

Not returning from 2011–12:
Bachelor Pad
Charlie's Angels
Cougar Town (moved to TBS in 2013)
Desperate Housewives
Duets
Extreme Makeover: Home Edition (moved to HGTV in 2020)
Final Witness
GCB
The Glass House
Man Up!
Missing
NY Med (returned in 2013–14)
Pan Am
Primetime
The River
Trust Us with Your Life
Work It
You Deserve It

CBS

Returning series
 2 Broke Girls
 48 Hours
 60 Minutes
 The Amazing Race
 The Big Bang Theory
 Big Brother
 Blue Bloods
 Criminal Minds
 CSI: Crime Scene Investigation
 CSI: NY
 The Good Wife
 Hawaii Five-0
 How I Met Your Mother
 The Mentalist
 Mike & Molly
 NCIS
 NCIS: Los Angeles
 Person of Interest
 Rules of Engagement
 Survivor
 Two and a Half Men
 Undercover Boss
 Unforgettable

New series
 The American Baking Competition *
 Brooklyn DA *
 Elementary
 Golden Boy *
 The Job *
 Made in Jersey
 Partners
 Under the Dome *
 Vegas

Not returning from 2011–12:
3
CSI: Miami
Dogs in the City
A Gifted Man
How to Be a Gentleman
NYC 22
¡Rob!

The CW

Returning series
90210
America's Next Top Model
Breaking Pointe
Gossip Girl
Hart of Dixie
Nikita
Oh Sit!
Supernatural
The Vampire Diaries
Whose Line Is It Anyway?

New series
Arrow
Beauty & the Beast
Capture *
The Carrie Diaries *
Cult *
Emily Owens, M.D.
Perfect Score *

Not returning from 2011–12:
The Catalina
H8R
The L.A. Complex
The Next: Fame Is at Your Doorstep
One Tree Hill
Remodeled
Ringer
The Secret Circle

Fox

Returning series
American Dad!
American Idol
Baseball Night in America
Bob's Burgers
Bones
The Cleveland Show
COPS
Family Guy
Fringe
Glee
Hell's Kitchen
Kitchen Nightmares
MasterChef
New Girl
NFL on Fox
Raising Hope
The Simpsons
So You Think You Can Dance
Touch
The X Factor

New series
Ben and Kate
Does Someone Have to Go? *
Fox College Football
The Following *
The Goodwin Games *
The Mindy Project
The Mob Doctor

Not returning from 2011–12:
Alcatraz
Allen Gregory
Breaking In
The Choice
The Finder
House
I Hate My Teenage Daughter
Napoleon Dynamite
Q'Viva! The Chosen
Take Me Out
Terra Nova

Ion Television

Returning series
Flashpoint
The Listener (moved from NBC)

New series
WWE Main Event

NBC

Returning series
30 Rock
America's Got Talent
American Ninja Warrior (moved from G4) 
The Apprentice
Betty White's Off Their Rockers
The Biggest Loser
Community
Dateline NBC
Fashion Star
Football Night in America
Grimm
Law & Order: Special Victims Unit
NBC Sunday Night Football
The Office
Parenthood
Parks and Recreation
Rock Center with Brian Williams
Saturday Night Live Weekend Update Thursday
Smash
Up All Night
The Voice
Whitney

New series
1600 Penn *
Animal Practice
Camp *
Chicago Fire
Crossing Lines *
Deception *
Do No Harm *
Get Out Alive with Bear Grylls *
Go On
Guys with Kids
Hannibal *
Hollywood Game Night *
The New Normal
Next Caller
Ready for Love *
Revolution
Save Me *
Siberia *
Take It All

Not returning from 2011–12:
Are You There, Chelsea?
Awake
Bent
Best Friends Forever
Chuck
Escape Routes
Fear Factor (moved to MTV in 2017)
The Firm
Free Agents
Harry's Law
Love in the Wild
The Playboy Club
Prime Suspect
Stars Earn Stripes
Who Do You Think You Are? (moved to TLC; returning to NBC in 2021–22)
Who's Still Standing?

Renewals and cancellations

Full season pickups

ABC
Nashville—Picked up for a full season on November 12, 2012.
The Neighbors—Picked up for a full season on October 29, 2012.
Scandal—Picked up for a full season on October 29, 2012.
Shark Tank—Picked up 2 additional episodes, totaling the season to 24 episodes on October 22, 2012. Plus 2 additional episodes on March 5, 2013 totaling the season to 26 episodes.

CBS
Elementary—Picked up for a full season on October 23, 2012.
Vegas—Picked up for a full 22-episode season on October 23, 2012, which was later reduced to 21 episodes.

The CW
Arrow—Picked up for a full season on October 22, 2012.

Fox
Ben and Kate—Picked up for an 18-episode full season on October 8, 2012.
The Mindy Project—Picked up for a 22-episode full season on October 8, 2012. plus 2 additional episodes on October 16, 2012 for a 24-episode season.

NBC
 Chicago Fire—Picked up for a full season on November 8, 2012.
 Go On—Picked up for a full season on October 2, 2012.
 The New Normal—Picked up for a full season on October 2, 2012.
 Revolution—Picked up for a full 22-episode season on October 2, 2012, which was later reduced to 20 episodes.

Renewals

ABC
20/20—Renewed for a thirty-fifth season on May 14, 2013.
America's Funniest Home Videos—Renewed for a twenty-fourth season on May 14, 2013.
The Bachelor—Renewed for an eighteenth season on May 14, 2013.
Castle—Renewed for a sixth season on May 10, 2013.
Dancing with the Stars—Renewed for a seventeenth season on May 14, 2013.
Grey's Anatomy—Renewed for a tenth season on May 10, 2013.
Last Man Standing—Renewed for a third season on May 10, 2013.
The Middle—Renewed for a fifth season on May 10, 2013. 
Modern Family—Renewed for a fifth season on May 10, 2013.
Nashville—Renewed for a second season on May 10, 2013.
The Neighbors—Renewed for a second season on May 11, 2013.
Once Upon a Time—Renewed for a third season on May 10, 2013.
Revenge—Renewed for a third season on May 10, 2013.
Saturday Night Football—Six more games were announced on March 5, 2013.
Scandal—Renewed for a third season on May 10, 2013.
Shark Tank—Renewed for a fifth season on May 14, 2013.
Suburgatory—Renewed for a third season on May 10, 2013.
The Taste—Renewed for a second season on May 14, 2013.
Wife Swap—Renewed for a third season on July 31, 2013.

CBS
2 Broke Girls—Renewed for a third season on March 27, 2013.
The Amazing Race—Renewed for a twenty-third season on March 27, 2013.
The Big Bang Theory—Renewed for a seventh season on January 12, 2011.
Blue Bloods—Renewed for a fourth season on March 27, 2013.
CSI: Crime Scene Investigation—Renewed for a fourteenth season on March 20, 2013.
Criminal Minds—Renewed for a ninth season on May 9, 2013.
Elementary—Renewed for a second season on March 27, 2013.
The Good Wife—Renewed for a fifth season on March 27, 2013.
Hawaii Five-0—Renewed for a fourth season on March 27, 2013.
How I Met Your Mother—Renewed for a ninth and final season on January 30, 2013.
The Mentalist—Renewed for a sixth season on March 27, 2013.
Mike & Molly—Renewed for a fourth season on March 27, 2013.
NCIS—Renewed for an eleventh season on February 1, 2013.
NCIS: Los Angeles—Renewed for a fifth season on March 27, 2013.
Person of Interest—Renewed for a third season on March 27, 2013.
Survivor—Renewed for a twenty-seventh season on March 27, 2013.
Two and a Half Men—Renewed for an eleventh season on April 26, 2013.
Undercover Boss—Renewed for a fifth season on March 27, 2013.
Under the Dome—Renewed for a second season on July 29, 2013.
Unforgettable— Renewed for a third season for Summer 2014.

The CW
America's Next Top Model—Renewed for a twentieth season on October 16, 2012.
Arrow—Renewed for a second season on February 11, 2013.
Beauty & the Beast—Renewed for a second season on April 26, 2013.
The Carrie Diaries—Renewed for a second season on May 9, 2013.
Hart of Dixie—Renewed for a third season on April 26, 2013.
Nikita—Renewed for a fourth season on May 9, 2013.
Supernatural—Renewed for a ninth season on February 11, 2013.
The Vampire Diaries—Renewed for a fifth season on February 11, 2013.
Whose Line Is It Anyway?—Renewed for a tenth season on July 29, 2013.

Fox
American Dad!—Renewed for its ninth season on May 10, 2012.
Bob's Burgers—Renewed for a fourth season on October 16, 2012.
Bones—Renewed for a ninth season on January 8, 2013.
Family Guy—Renewed for a twelfth season on May 10, 2012.
The Following—Renewed for a second season on March 4, 2013.
Glee—Renewed for a fifth season on April 19, 2013.
The Mindy Project—Renewed for a second season on March 4, 2013.
New Girl—Renewed for a third season on March 4, 2013.
Raising Hope—Renewed for a fourth season on March 4, 2013.
The Simpsons—Renewed for its twenty-fifth season on October 7, 2011.
The X Factor—Renewed for a third season on October 22, 2012.

NBC
The Apprentice—Renewed for a fourteenth season on May 12, 2013.
The Biggest Loser—Renewed for a fifteenth season on May 12, 2013.
Chicago Fire—Renewed for a second season on April 26, 2013.
Community—Renewed for a fifth season on May 10, 2013.
Football Night in America—Renewed for an eighth season on August 19, 2009.
Grimm—Renewed for a third season on April 26, 2013.
Hannibal—Renewed for a second season on May 30, 2013.
Hollywood Game Night—Renewed for a 10 episode second season on August 20, 2013.
Last Comic Standing—Previously canceled, NBC renewed the series for an eighth season on November 13, 2013.
Law & Order: Special Victims Unit—Renewed for a fifteenth season on April 26, 2013.
NBC Sunday Night Football—Renewed for an eighth season on August 19, 2009.
Parenthood—Renewed for a fifth season on April 26, 2013.
Parks and Recreation—Renewed for a sixth season on May 9, 2013.
Revolution—Renewed for a second season on April 26, 2013.
The Sing-Off—Previously canceled, NBC renewed the series for a fourth season on March 14, 2013.
The Voice—Renewed for a fifth and sixth season on September 25, 2012.

Cancellations/Series endings

ABC
666 Park Avenue—Canceled on November 16, 2012. The final episode aired on July 13, 2013.
Body of Proof—Canceled on May 10, 2013.
Don't Trust the B---- in Apartment 23—Canceled on January 22, 2013.
Family Tools—Canceled on May 10, 2013.
Happy Endings—Canceled on May 10, 2013.
How to Live with Your Parents (For the Rest of Your Life)—Canceled on May 10, 2013.
Last Resort—Canceled on November 16, 2012. The final episode aired on January 24, 2013.
Malibu Country—Canceled on May 10, 2013.
Private Practice—It was announced on October 19, 2012 that season six would be the final season. The series concluded on January 22, 2013.
Red Widow—Canceled on May 10, 2013.
Zero Hour—Canceled on March 1, 2013 due to low ratings after three episodes. The final episode aired on August 3, 2013.

CBS
CSI: NY—Canceled on May 10, 2013 after nine seasons.
Friend Me—Confirmed as canceled on July 29, 2013.
Golden Boy—Canceled on May 10, 2013.
The Job—Canceled on February 18, 2013 due to low ratings after two episodes. It is unclear if the remaining episodes will air.
Made in Jersey—Canceled on October 10, 2012 due to low ratings after two episodes. As of December 29, 2012, eight episodes have aired. This was the first cancellation of the season.
Partners—Canceled on November 16, 2012 due to low ratings after six episodes.
Rules of Engagement—Canceled on May 10, 2013 after seven seasons.
Vegas—Canceled on May 10, 2013.

The CW
90210—It was announced on February 28, 2013 that season five would be the final season. The series concluded on May 13, 2013.
Cult—Canceled on April 10, 2013. The series concluded on July 12, 2013.
Emily Owens, M.D.—Canceled on November 28, 2012. The series concluded on February 5, 2013. 
Gossip Girl—It was announced on May 11, 2012 that season six would be the final season. The series concluded on December 17, 2012.

Fox
Ben and Kate—Canceled on January 23, 2013. Two days after being pulled from the schedule, production was shut down after 16 episodes of a 19 episode order were filmed.
The Cleveland Show—Canceled on April 17, 2013, after four seasons. The series concluded on May 19, 2013.
COPS—Canceled in May 2013 after twenty-five seasons. The series moved to Spike for its twenty-sixth season.
Fringe—It was announced on April 26, 2012 that season five would be the final season. The series concluded on January 18, 2013.
The Mob Doctor—Canceled on November 28, 2012. The series concluded on January 7, 2013.
Touch—Canceled on May 9, 2013, after two seasons.

Ion Television
Flashpoint—It was announced on May 1, 2012 that season five would be the final season. The series concluded on January 22, 2013.

NBC
1600 Penn—Canceled on May 9, 2013.
30 Rock—It was announced on May 14, 2012 that season seven would be the final season. The series concluded on January 31, 2013.
Animal Practice—Canceled on October 18, 2012 due to low ratings after five episodes.
Betty White's Off Their Rockers—Canceled on July 11, 2013 after two seasons. It was announced on October 18, 2013 that the series would move to Lifetime.
Camp—Cancelled on October 1, 2013 after one season.
Deception—Canceled on May 8, 2013.
Do No Harm—Canceled on February 8, 2013 due to low ratings after two episodes.
Fashion Star—Canceled on July 27, 2013.
Go On—Canceled on May 10, 2013.
Guys with Kids—Canceled on May 9, 2013.
The New Normal—Canceled on May 10, 2013.
Next Caller—It was announced on October 12, 2012 that the series would not air.
The Office—It was announced on August 21, 2012 that season nine would be the final season. The series concluded on May 16, 2013.
Ready for Love—Canceled on April 19, 2013 due to low ratings after two episodes. The last episode aired on April 23, 2013.
Rock Center with Brian Williams—Canceled on May 10, 2013.
Smash—Canceled on May 10, 2013.
Up All Night—Canceled on May 9, 2013 after two seasons.
Whitney—Canceled on May 9, 2013 after two seasons.

See also
2012–13 United States network television schedule (daytime)
2012–13 United States network television schedule (late night)

Top weekly ratings 
 Data sources: AC Nielsen, TV By The Numbers

Total Viewers

18-49 Viewers

Notes

References

United States primetime network television schedules
2012 in American television
2013 in American television